The Philip Hess House, also known as the Robert R. Jefferson House and Bowman House, is a historic home located in Jefferson City, Missouri. It was built between 1857 and 1864, and is a one-story, five bay, Missouri-German Vernacular brick home. It has a gable roof and decorative brick cornice.

It was listed on the National Register of Historic Places in 2002.

References

Houses on the National Register of Historic Places in Missouri
Houses completed in 1864
Buildings and structures in Jefferson City, Missouri
National Register of Historic Places in Cole County, Missouri
1864 establishments in Missouri